West Gosforth was an electoral ward in the north of Newcastle upon Tyne, Tyne and Wear, England. It was created in 2004 and abolished in 2018. The population of the ward is 9,681, increasing to 9,991 at the 2011 Census, 3.7% of the total population of Newcastle upon Tyne. Car ownership in the area is 78.1%, higher than the city average of 54.7%.

Other wards in Gosforth include Gosforth, Dene and South Gosforth, Fawdon and West Gosforth, and Parklands (which includes northern Gosforth including Melton Park and Brunton Park).

Education 
There are six schools within the West Gosforth ward:
 Archibald First School
 Gosforth Junior High Academy
 Wyndham RC Primary School
 St Charles RC Primary School
 Westfield School
 Central Newcastle High School (part of Junior School)

Recreation and leisure 

The ward has many large green spaces including Dukes Moor, Coxlodge Welfare Ground and St. Nicholas Park. The ward has two Tyne and Wear Metro stations: Regent Centre and Wansbeck Road.

The ward has a library and swimming pool. The swimming pool is currently managed by Greenwich Leisure Limited under the brand "Better Leisure" following a takeover in 2013. In November 2006, Gosforth Library was demolished and replaced with a new two-storey building, during these works the library operated in temporary buildings located nearby. The new Gosforth Library and Customer Service Centre building was formally opened on 8 February 2008 by John Grundy, a local resident and television presenter. The library is used as a polling station for one of the four voting districts in West Gosforth.

Business 
West Gosforth has a business park, called Regent Centre, which is home to companies such as Virgin Money (formerly Northern Rock).

Shopping 
Wansbeck Road has a small shopping centre which includes small Asda and Nisa supermarkets. Until 2019 the Nisa store had been a Co-op Food.

The site of the Asda store was formerly a Kwik Save (and briefly FreshXpress) store before being demolished in 2008 and re-built from scratch as a Netto. This Netto/Asda store opened on 5 November 2009 and also used the former land of the Collingwood pub. Following Asda's buyout of Netto this store was converted into an Asda, their second such store in Gosforth. The west half of Gosforth High Street was also in the ward.

Ward boundary 
The West Gosforth ward boundary started at the Blue House roundabout and heads north along the Great North Road/Gosforth High Street (odd numbers included.) Opposite the Asda Superstore, it turns west at the roundabout and follows the Metro line to Wansbeck Road station. It heads south along Wansbeck Road to Jubilee Road before turning east along Jubilee Road (odd numbers included) to the Welford Daycare Centre. The boundary continues west to the rear of St Nicholas Nature Reserve and the rear of the properties on Prince's Meadow onto Kenton Road (Numbers 23–59 Wall Close included.) It continues south along Kenton Road to Salter's Road, then turns west to the rear of Kenton Park Shopping Centre and continues south to the rear of Wyndham County Primary School to Nuns Moor/Newcastle United Golf Course. Finally it travels east along the moor to the Grandstand Road/ Kenton Road junction and continues east along Grandstand Road to the Blue House roundabout.

Charts and tables 

Owner occupied property stands at 80.4% much higher than the city average of 53.3%. The properties are as follows.

References

External links 
 West Gosforth Ward at Newcastle City Council
 West Gosforth Census 2001 at Newcastle City Council

Districts of Newcastle upon Tyne
Wards of Newcastle upon Tyne